Nastassja Burnett (born 20 February 1992) is an Italian former professional tennis player.

Her father is Scottish and her mother is Polish. On 3 March 2014, she reached her highest singles ranking by the WTA of 121, whilst her best doubles ranking was 380 on 14 November 2011.

ITF Circuit finals

Singles: 9 (7 titles, 2 runner-ups)

References

External links
 
 
 

1992 births
Living people
Tennis players from Rome
Italian female tennis players
Italian people of Polish descent
Italian people of Scottish descent